The Theo Marks Stakes is an Australian Turf Club Group 2 Thoroughbred quality handicap horse race, for horses aged three years old and older, over a distance of 1300 metres, held annually at Rosehill Racecourse, Sydney, Australia in September. Total prizemoney for the race is A$250,000.

History
The race is named after Theodore John Marks, architect and chairman of the Rosehill Racing Club (1919-41).

Name
 2010–2013 - Sebring Sprint.
 2014 onwards - Theo Marks Stakes

Grade
 1946–1978 - Principal Race
 1979 onwards - Group 2

Distance
 1946–1972 - 7 furlongs  (~1400 metres)
 1973–1984 – 1400 metres
 1985–1990 – 1300 metres
 1991 – 1280 metres
 1992–2008 – 1300 metres
 2009–2010 – 1400 metres
 2011 – 1300 metres
 2012–2014 – 1400 metres
 2015 – 1300 metres

Venue
 1991 - Canterbury Racecourse
 2021 - Kembla Grange Racecourse

Winners

 2022 - Kiku
 2021 - Chat
 2020 - Wild Planet
 2019 - Arcadia Queen
 2018 - Home Of The Brave
 2017 - Deploy
 2016 - Mackintosh
 2015 - Winx
 2014 - Cluster
 2013 - Riva De Lago
 2012 - Ambidexter
 2011 - Master Of Design
 2010 - More Joyous
 2009 - Racing To Win
 2008 - Hurried Choice
 2007 - †race not held
 2006 - Racing To Win
 2005 - Paratroopers
 2004 - Falkirk
 2003 - Fiery Venture
 2002 - Defier
 2001 - Shogun Lodge
 2000 - Hire
 1999 - Adam
 1998 - Pleasure Giver
 1997 - Catalan Opening
 1996 - Mamzelle Pedrille
 1995 - Ivory's Irish
 1994 - Rouslan
 1993 - Double Your Bet
 1992 - Final Card
 1991 - Joanne
 1990 - Alquoz
 1989 - From The Planet
 1988 - Targlish
 1987 - Groucho
 1986 - Zip Home
 1985 - Vari's Ace
 1984 - Inspired
 1983 - Another Phenomenon
 1982 - Ksar Royal
 1981 - Arbogast
 1980 - Silver Wraith
 1979 - Scomeld
 1978 - Party's Pride
 1977 - Blockbuster
 1976 - Ease The Squeeze
 1975 - Summer Fantasy
 1974 - Purple Patch
 1973 - I'm Scarlet
 1972 - Beaches
 1971 - Crown Law
 1970 - Ricochet
 1969 - Nausori
 1968 - Gay Gauntlet
 1967 - Cabochon
 1966 - Time And Tide
 1965 - Time And Tide
 1964 - Game Prince
 1963 - Time And Tide
 1962 - Bush Belle
 1961 - Martello Towers
 1960 - French Descent
 1959 - In Love
 1958 - Gay Port
 1957 - Teranyan
 1956 - French Charm
 1955 - Hans
 1954 - Sunny Hour
 1953 - Carioca
 1952 - Tossing
 1951 - Bankbrook
 1950 - Donegal
 1949 - Hisign
 1948 - The Groom
 1947 - Murray Stream
 1946 - Shannon 

† Not held because of outbreak of equine influenza

See also
 List of Australian Group races
 Group races

External links 
 Theo Marks Stakes (ATC)

References

Horse races in Australia